This is a list of women writers who were born in Hungary or whose writings are associated with that country.

A
Mariska Ady (1888–1977), poet

B
Mária Bajzek Lukács (born 1960), Hungarian-born, Slovene-language writer, educator and translator
Zsófia Balla (born 1949) Romanian-born Hungarian poet and essayist
Linda Vero Ban (born 1976), writer on Jewish identity and spirituality
Zsófia Bán (born 1957), novelist, literary writer and critic
Kata Bethlen (1700–1759), memoirist, letter writer and autobiographer
Janka Boga (1889–1963), playwright and essayist
Katalin Bogyay (born 1956), politician, non-fiction writer and critic 
Edith Bone (1889–1975), journalist and autobiographer 
Ágota Bozai (born 1965), novelist and translator
Edith Bruck (born 1932), novelist and playwright writing in Italian
Zsuzsanna Budapest (born 1940), Hungarian-born American journalist, playwright and feminist

D
Anna Dániel (1908–2003), novelist, children's writer and historian

E
Renée Erdős (1879–1956), poet and novelist

F
Kinga Fabó (1953–2021), poet, essayist and linguist
Klára Fehér (1919–1996), novelist and children's writer
Éva Földes (1914–1981), epic works Olympic medallist for Der Jugendquell (Well of Youth)
Flora Frangepán (fl. 1743), writer and translator

G
Erzsébet Galgóczi (1930–1989), short story writer, playwright and screenwriter
Ágnes Gergely (born 1933), novelist, poet and translator
Alisz Goriupp (1894–1979), librarian and bibliographer

J
Éva Janikovszky (1926–2003), novelist and children's writer
Ida Jenbach (1868 – c.1943), German-language journalist and screenwriter

K
Margit Kaffka (1880–1918), poet, novelist and memoirist
Teréz Karacs (1808–1892), memoirist and women's rights activist
Etelka Kenéz Heka (born 1936), writer, poet and singer
Rivka Keren (born 1946), fiction and children's writer in Hungarian and Hebrew 
Annamária Kinde (1956–2014), Romanian-born Hungarian poet and journalist
Noémi Kiss (born 1974), short story writer and essayist
Helene Kottanner (15th c.), German-language memoirist
Agota Kristof (1935–2011), French-language poet, novelist and short story writer
Žofia Kubini (17th c.), poet writing in old Czech

L
Ágnes Lehóczky (born 1976), poet
Laura Leiner (born 1985), novelist

M
Gitta Mallasz (1907–1992), mystical writer
Réka Mán-Várhegyi (born 1979), fiction writer
Kati Marton (born 1949), Hungarian-American journalist and non-fiction writer
Béláné Mocsáry (1845–1917), Hungarian geographer and travel writer
Terézia Mora (born 1971), German-language fiction writer

N
Borbála Nádasdy (born 1939), novelist, memoirist and ballet master
Ágnes Nemes Nagy (1922–1991), poet, translator and educator

O
Emma Orczy (1865–1947), Hungarian-born novelist and playwright writing in English

P
Kata Szidónia Petrőczy (1659–1708), Hungarian Baroque prose writer and poet
Susan Polgar (born 1969), chess writer and champion

R
Ágnes Rapai (born 1952), poet writing in Hungarian and German
Lea Ráskay (early 16th century), manuscript copier, translator and nun
Kati Rekai (1921–2010), Hungarian-born English-language children's writer

S
Regina Saphier, writer, blogger, and TED video subtitle translator
Kate Seredy (1899–1975), Hungarian-born English-language children's writer and illustrator 
Henriett Seth F. (real name Henrietta Fajcsák, born 1980), autistic poet, writer and artist
Magda Szabó (1917–2007), novelist, playwright and poet
Noémi Szécsi (born 1976), novelist and translator
Júlia Székely (1906–1986), novelist, biographer and musician
Mária Szepes (1908–2007), novelist, autobiographer and screenwriter
Edina Szvoren (born 1974), novelist

T
Judit Dukai Takách (wrote as Malvina, 1795–1836), poet
Kata Tisza (born 1980), novelist
Cécile Tormay (1876–1937), fiction writer and translator
U

 Ida Urr (1904–1989), poet and physician (born in Czechoslovakia)

See also
List of women writers
List of Hungarian writers

References

-
Hungarian women writers, List of
Writers
Women writers, List of Hungarian